Girolamo Parisani or Hieronymus Parisani (died 1653) was a Roman Catholic prelate who served as Bishop of Polignano (1629–1638).

Biography
On 14 March 1629, Girolamo Parisani was appointed during the papacy of Pope Urban VIII as Bishop of Polignano.
On 17 April 1629, he was consecrated bishop by Antonio Marcello Barberini, Cardinal-Priest of Sant'Onofrio. 
He served as Bishop of Polignano until his death in 1638.
While bishop he was the principal co-consecrator of Girolamo Magnesi, Bishop of Potenza (1634).

References 

17th-century Italian Roman Catholic bishops
Bishops appointed by Pope Urban VIII
1638 deaths